Austranten Rock is an isolated rock outcrop lying  southeast of Todt Ridge, at the eastern extremity of the Gruber Mountains and the Wohlthat Mountains, in Queen Maud Land of Antarctica. It was discovered and plotted from air photos by the Third German Antarctic Expedition, 1938–39, re-plotted from air photos and surveys by the Sixth Norwegian Antarctic Expedition, 1956–60, and named "Austranten" (the "east ridge").

References
 

Rock formations of Queen Maud Land
Princess Astrid Coast